Dayo Ade (born 1972) is a Canadian actor who has appeared in several television shows and films. His most notable role was in the Degrassi teen drama franchise, playing Bryant Lester "BLT" Thomas in Degrassi Junior High (1987-89) and Degrassi High (1989-91). More recently, he is known for his roles in series such as Workin' Moms.

Biography 
He was born in Lagos, Nigeria and moved with his family to Toronto, Ontario, Canada at an early age. He played Bryant Lester "BLT" Thomas in Degrassi Junior High and Degrassi High. He appeared as nurse Leo Beckett on the CBC Television series Cracked. He voiced as Hunter Hakka in Starlink: Battle for Atlas.

He also had guest appearances in the Star Trek: Enterprise episode "Borderland", in the Alias episode "The Awful Truth", in the Scrubs episode "My Malpractical Decision", and in the Charmed episode "We're Off to See the Wizard". He appeared in the Lost episodes "What Kate Does" and "Lighthouse".

In 2021, he joined the cast of Bob Hearts Abishola as Abishola's Nigerian husband Tayo Adebambo, and starred in the film Cinema of Sleep. At the 2021 Whistler Film Festival, he won the award for Best Performance in a Borsos Competition Film for Cinema of Sleep.

Filmography

Film

Television

Video games

References

External links
 

1972 births
21st-century Canadian male actors
Black Canadian male actors
Canadian male film actors
Canadian male television actors
Canadian male voice actors
Canadian people of Nigerian descent
Living people
Nigerian emigrants to Canada
Male actors from Lagos